Pury is a surname. Notable people with the surname include:

William Pury (1489–1537), English Member of Parliament
Simon de Pury (born 1951), Swiss auctioneer, art dealer, and collector